This is a list of people associated with the Dublin Institute of Technology, including notable alumni and faculty members.

Engineers
 Neville J Hogan, Emeritus Professor, Massachusetts Institute of Technology; awarded the Rufus Oldenburger Medal.

Architects
 Sam Stephenson
 David Collins (interior designer) 
 Arthur Gibney
 Des McMahon of Gilroy McMahon Architects
 John Meagher of  De Blacam & Meagher Architects
 Angela Brady, Past President of Royal Institution of British Architects
 Graham Dwyer, convicted of the Murder of Elaine O'Hara

Artists
 Robert Ballagh, artist, painter and designer
Niall de Buitléar, artist
 Niall McCormack, painter
 Ramie Leahy, artist
 Duthain Dealbh group of sculptors Daniel Doyle, Niall Magee and Alan Magee,

Authors
 Colum McCann, writer and Distinguished Professor of Creative Writing, Hunter College, New York City
 Arthur Mathews, writer
 Michael Nugent, writer and activist
 Brendan Behan, writer
 George O'Brien, writer and Professor of English, Georgetown University, Washington, D.C.
 Jimmy Murphy (playwright)
 Fergal O'Byrne, playwright
 Ronan Moore, writer

Businesspeople
 Martin Shanahan, CEO, IDA Ireland
 Bobby Kerr (businessman), Hotelier and Cafe Entrepreneur
 Brendan McDonagh, Managing Director of the National Asset Management Agency
 Sean J. Conlon, US Real Estate Entrepreneur
  Kevin McCourt (businessman) and later Director-General of RTÉ
 Alan Joyce (executive), Chief Executive Officer of Qantas

Politicians
 Bertie Ahern former Taoiseach
 Jim Mitchell former Minister for Justice and Deputy Leader of Fine Gael 
 Mary Hanafin former Cabinet Minister
 Vincent Brady former Teachta Dála (TD) and former Minister of Defence
 Gay Mitchell MEP, former minister and 2011 Fine Gael presidential nominee
 Emmet Stagg Teachta Dála (TD) and Labour Party Chief Whip
 Simon Harris Teachta Dála (TD) and Minister for Health.
 Regina Doherty Senator and former and Minister for Employment Affairs and Social Protection.
 Eric Byrne Teachta Dála (TD)  
 Pearse Doherty Teachta Dála (TD)
 Dessie Ellis Teachta Dála (TD)  
 Michael Creed Teachta Dála (TD) and Minister for Agriculture, Food and the Marine.
 Margaret Ekpo Nigerian woman's activist and politician  
 Brendan Halligan economist and politician  
 Jack Murphy former Teachta Dála (TD) 
 Katharine Bulbulia former Senator and health advocate 
 Noel Ahern former Teachta Dála (TD) 
 Mary Wallace former Teachta Dála (TD)  
 Eoin Ryan Jnr former Teachta Dála (TD) and MEP 
 Tony Kett former Senator 
 Seán Ryan former Teachta Dála (TD)
 Brendan Ryan Teachta Dála (TD)
 Ronan Moore Councillor

Diplomats
 Diarmuid O’Leary, Irish Ambassador to Luxembourg

Journalists and broadcasters
 Geraldine Kennedy, former Editor, Irish Times
 Seamus Martin, former international editor, Irish Times
 Bryan Dobson, RTÉ Six One news presenter
 Carole Coleman, RTÉ News Washington correspondent
 Marian Finucane, RTÉ radio presenter
 George Hook, RTÉ rugby pundit and radio presenter
 Orla Guerin, BBC News correspondent
 Ray Kennedy, RTÉ news presenter and former Irish correspondent for Sky News
 Ray Foley, radio presenter
 Philip Reid (author), Sportswriter
 Colette Fitzpatrick, TV3 anchor
 Darren Kennedy, TV presenter, fashion writer and stylist
 Eoghan Corry, Travel writer
 Paddy Murray, newspaper editor and comedy writer
 Conor McAnally, US TV producer

Sportspeople
 Paul McGinley, golfer, captained Europe in its 2014 Ryder Cup victory
 John Delaney, CEO of the Football Association of Ireland
 Brian Kerr, former manager of Republic of Ireland national football team
 Stephen Roche, cycling
 Ronnie Dawson (rugby union)
 Aidan O'Shea, Darran O'Sullivan, Paul Flynn, Kevin McManamon, Darragh Ó Sé, Colin Walshe, Kevin McLoughlin, Mark Collins and Jason Doherty
 Kevin O'Reilly, Ollie Canning, Conor McCormack, David Treacy and Willie O'Dwyer, hurling
 Jane Dolan And Sarah Ryan (camogie)
 Becky Lynch, wrestler
 John Kavanagh, MMA trainer

Musicians

 David Flynn, Composer
 The Boomtown Rats, Irish band formed by Bob Geldof
 Jimi Shields, Musician and Landscape Architect 
 Larry Mullen, Jr., Drummer with U2
 Ciarán Farrell, Composer
 Ryan O'Shaughnessy, Singer and Songwriter
 Lynn Hilary and Deirdre Shannon, Singers, formerly of Anúna and Celtic Woman
 Aebh Kelly, soprano
 Eimear Quinn, soprano, popular singer formerly of Anúna

Entertainers
 Domhnall Gleeson, actor, director, and writer
 John Moore (director), film director
 Nick Vincent Murphy, screenwriter
 Rouzbeh Rashidi, avant-garde filmmaker
 Shimmy Marcus, filmmaker
 Jack Nolan, actor
 Daryl McCormack, actor

Fashion designers
 Louise Kennedy

Chefs
 Stuart O'Keeffe, celebrity chef and US television personality
 Richard Corrigan chef
 Darina Allen, Irish chef, food writer, TV personality
 Kevin Dundon, chef

 
Dublin Institute of Technology